The 2012 Martyr's Memorial A-Division League season, also known as the Martyrs' Memorial Red Bull 'A' Division League Football Tournament 2012 for sponsorship reasons, was the 40th season of the Martyr's Memorial A-Division League since its establishment in 1954/55. A total of 16 teams are competing in the league. The season began on 20 November 2012 and concluded on 1 April 2013. Nepal Police Club were the defending champions, having won their fourth A- Division League title the previous season.

After the season, New Road Team would be relegated to 2016 Martyr's Memorial B-Division League for financial difficulties.

Teams

League table

The top eight teams qualified for the Super League.

Super League

Top scorers

References

Martyr's Memorial A-Division League seasons
1
Nepal